The Democratic Party leadership election was held on 17 December 2000 for the 30-member 4th Central Committee of the Democratic Party in Hong Kong, including chairman and two vice-chairman posts. Founding Chairman Martin Lee Chu-ming was re-elected uncontestedly for the fourth consecutive term.

Eligibility
The Central Committee was elected by the party congress. All public office holders, including the members of the Legislative Council and District Councils, are eligible to vote in the party congress. Every 30 members can also elect a delegate who holds one vote in the congress.

Overview
The Founding Chairman Martin Lee Chu-ming had been holding the Chairmanship since 1994. According to the party's rule, the party chairmanship is restricted with four-term limit, thus it would be the last term for Martin Lee to run for Chairman.

The Democratic Party suffered from the decline in popularity and intra-party struggles in recent years. In the last LegCo election in September, the party lost 170,000 votes compared to 1998. The Young Turks faction was at the edge of splitting with the party. They were discontent with the monopoly of the Central Committee by the party leaders and the party's position on grassroots issues. They had even organised the Social Democratic Forum, which catered more to the grassroots interests.

Some members thought that the Chairman should be responsible for the problems within the party. They disliked Martin Lee supporting Audrey Eu for contesting the 2000 Hong Kong Island by-election, rather his own party members.

Results
The Young Turks did not show up in the party congress. Martin Lee was elected with 230 for, 7 against and 55 abstentions, with Law Chi-kwong and Lee Wing-tat elected as Vice-Chairmen uncontestedly. Cheung Yin-tung succeeded Law Chi-kwong as the party's Secretary.  Martin Lee said it was a warning to him as he got so many abstentions than last election. He stated that he should concentrated more on his work. 28 candidates contested for 27 seats in the Central Committee, only Tai Po District Councillor Edward Lee Chi-shing unelected.

The 4th Central Committee was formed as following:
 Chairman: Martin Lee
 Vice-Chairmen: Law Chi-kwong, Lee Wing-tat
 Secretary: Cheung Yin-tung
 Treasurer: Wong Bing-kuen 
 Executive Committee Members:

 Chan King-ming
 Chan Ka-wai
 Josephine Chan Shu-ying
 Cheung Man-kwong
 Albert Ho Chun-yan
 Ng Wing-fai
 Szeto Wah
 Tsui Hon-kwong
 Wu Chi-wai
 Yeung Sum

 Central Committee Members:

 Chan Chak-chiu
 Cheung Wing-fai
 Cheung Yuet-lan
 Chow Wai-tung
 Fung Wai-kwong
 Ho Wai-to
 Law Chung-ngai
 Almustafa Lee Lap-hong
 Mark Li Kin-yin
 Sin Chung-kai
 James To Kun-sun
 Wong Sing-chi
 Zachary Wong Wai-yin
 Wong Leung-hi
 Yuen Bun-keung

References

Political party leadership elections in Hong Kong
Democratic Party (Hong Kong)
2000 in Hong Kong
2000 elections in China
Democratic Party (HK) leadership election